Kostruchey is a rural locality (a settlement) in Annenskoye Rural Settlement, Vytegorsky District, Vologda Oblast, Russia. The population was 50 as of 2002.

Geography 
Kostruchey is located 55 km southeast of Vytegra (the district's administrative centre) by road. Annensky Most is the nearest rural locality.

References 

Rural localities in Vytegorsky District